The Minnesota Library Association (MLA) is a professional association and state chapter of the American Library Association, headquartered in Minneapolis, Minnesota.

Mission
MLA's mission states: "The Minnesota Library Association is an association of library supporters, representing all types of libraries by helping them accomplish together what none can do alone. MLA serves the interests of its members by facilitating educational opportunities, supporting strong ethical standards, providing legislative assistance, and fostering connections between the library community and various constituencies."

History
Minnesota was one of the first states to establish a state library association, following New York, New Hampshire, Massachusetts, Illinois, and New Jersey as Melvil Dewey encouraged state library associations "to carry on the rapidly developing modern library work." The Minnesota Library Association organized and held the first meeting on December 29, 1891, initiated by William Watts Folwell.   The first officers elected at the 1891 meeting included William Watts Folwell (president), Helen J. McCaine (vice president), and J.F. Williams (secretary).

The first meeting was publicized in an announcement in the St. Paul Pioneer Press. The initial meeting was held at the Minnesota Historical Society in St. Paul, MN, and the purpose of the first meeting was to organize a state library association by using a plan recommended by the American Library Association. Early meetings usually consisted of presented papers and discussions, and the 1896 annual meeting was collaborative with the Minnesota Education Association.  Gratia Countryman, secretary of MLA at the time, elaborated, "early in the history of the association, librarians recognized that schools and libraries should cooperate closely as the two arms of the educational system."

Amendments to the MLA constitution in 1898 allowed for membership to be extended to any individual interested in libraries, and it was determined that future annual meetings were to occur in October with locations determined by the executive committee. Also important during this time period, MLA passed two resolutions supporting legislation to establish a state library commission and create a system of traveling libraries. This bill was passed in 1899 and was considered a major accomplishment for MLA. The Minnesota Public Library Commission began in 1900, and Clara Baldwin served as the first librarian. Another resolution was passed in 1899 requesting that a library science course be added to the curriculum at the University of Minnesota. This was approved, and courses were soon offered.

Various sections were created in the following years including Trustees, Traveling Library, Children’s Librarians, Public Library, Education, and College and Reference Librarians. The 1908 annual meeting occurred at the ALA Annual Conference that was held at Lake Minnetonka. Also during the early 1900s, MLA had joint meetings with other state associations including the Wisconsin Library Association in 1909 and the North Dakota Library Association in 1910.

Membership originally was a one dollar fee with no annual dues. By 1898, annual dues were set at fifty cents. Membership dues continued to increase, but as of 1910, there were 125 members. Recruitment became a priority in 1921, only to be permanently tabled during the Depression when new graduates could not find jobs.

During and between the two World Wars, MLA made important administrative decisions that impacted its own structure, its relationships with the State of Minnesota, and with the American Library Association. MLA adopted a new constitution that redrafted the slate of officers, changed the makeup of the executive committee, and introduced institutional memberships. By 1939, members approved another new constitution. Each successive constitution both reflected and defined MLA’s activities. By-laws were added that named standing committees, detailed duties of the officers, and created procedures to establish sections.

The MLA continued to influence state legislation. It successfully recommended merging the Public Library Commission with the Minnesota Department of Education (1919), allowing small town school libraries to double as public libraries (1929), and requiring certification of school librarians (1935). In 1938-40 biennium, the Library Planning Division worked with the Library Division of the MDE to develop the first legislative platform.

The American Library Association’s influence guided much of MLA’s plans and decisions. MLA followed ALA’s lead on such issues as children’s services, certification and standardization. MLA became a chapter of ALA in 1921, and a leader in working with other state associations.

Social issues
Since World War II, MLA has taken a stand on social issues by supporting a nuclear freeze (1983), exploring arbitration for non-union librarians (1976), and voicing support for independent booksellers (1987).

In 1997 when heavy rains flooded many Minnesota libraries, MLA established a Disaster Relief Fund.

Current and past presidents
The following persons have been president of the association:

 2017 Amy Boese
 2016 Margaret Stone
 2015 Maggie Snow 
 2014 Michele McGraw 
 2013 Kristen Mastel
 2012 Carla Urban
 2011 Robin Ewing
 2010 Kathleen James
 2009 Ken Behringer
 2008 Wendy Wendt
 2007 Heidi Hoks
 2006 Audrey Betcher
 2005 Marlene Moulton Janssen
 2004 Bill Sozansky
 2003 Melissa Brechon
 2002 Carol Johnson
 2001 Chris Olson
 2000 Joan B. Larson
 1999 Beth Kelly
 1998 Mary Martin
 1997 Barbara Jauquet-Kalinoski
 1996 Mark Ranum
 1995 Linda DeBeau-Melting
 1994 Linda DeBeau-Melting
 1993 David Barton
 1992 Janet Kinney
 1991 Gretchen Wronka
 1990 Muriel J. Rossman 
 1989/88 Michael Haeuser
 1988 Mona Carmack 
 1987, Janice Feye-Stukas
 1986 Donald Pearce
 1985 Joseph Kimbrough
 1983/84 Michael Kathman
 1982/83 Marlys O'Brien
 1981/82 Mary Wagner
 1980/81 Patricia Harpole 
 1979/80 Jerry Young
 1978/79 Nancy Olson 
 1977/78 Mary Heiges 
 1976/77 Janet Schroeder
 1975/76 Dale Carrison
 1974/75 Barbara Hughes
 1973/74 Geraldine King
 1972/73 Edward Swanson
 1971/72 David Smith
 1970/71 Gil Johnsson
 1969/70 Helen Young 
 1968/69 Luther Brown 
 1967/68 Roderick MacDonald
 1966/67 James Ubel
 1965/66 Willard Donahue
 1964/65 Marie Knudson 
 1962/64 George Gardner 
 1961/62 Arlene Russell 
 1960/61 Robert Simonds
 1959/60 Merle Lennartson 
 1958/59 Robert Rohlf
 1957/58 David Berninghausen
 1956/57 Erana Stadler 
 1955/56 Helen Sweasy 
 1954/55 David Watkins 
 1953/54 Alice Brunat 
 1952/53 Maurine Hoffmann 
 1951/52 Anita Saxine 
 1950/51 Mary Baker 
 1949/50 Agatha Klein
 1948/49 Glenn Lewis
 1947/48 Donald Strout
 1946/47 Lucille Gottry 
 1945/46 Emily Mayne 
 1944/45 Jean Gardiner Smith 
 1943/44 Rella Havens 
 1942/43 Elizabeth Bond 
 1941/42 Eileen Thornton
 1940/41 Florence Love 
 1939/40 Hazel Halgrim
 1938/39 Ruth Rosholt
 1937/38 Jane Morey 
 1936/37 Lura Hutchinson 
 1935/36 Eleanor Hermann 
 1934/35 Irma Walker 
 1933/34 Alma Penrose 
 1932/33 Ethel Berry 
 1931/32 Grace Stevens
 1930/31 Perrie Jones 
 1929/30 Edna Moore 
 1928/29 Dorothy Hurlbert
 1927/28 Stella Bertleson
 1926/27 Harriet Wood
 1925/26 Adeline Davidson
 1924/25 Ethel McCubrey
 1923/24 Webster Wheelock
 1922/23 Frank Walter
 1921/22 Alice Dunlap
 1920/21 Ruth Rosholt
 1919/20 Miriam Carey
 1918/19 Jenny Lind Blachard
 1917/18 Dorothy Hurlbert
 1916/17 Mable Newhard
 1915/16 Frances Earhart
 1914/15 W. Dawson Johnston
 1913/14 Martha Wilson
 1912/13 James Gerould
 1911/12 Margaret Palmer
 1910/11 Helen McCaine
 1909/10 Clara Baldwin
 1907/09 Warren Upham
 1906/07 Lettie Crafts
 1905/06 Maude VanBuren
 1904/05 Gratia Countryman
 1903/04 Katherine Beals
 1902/03 Victor Nilsson
 1900/02 Alice Farr
 1891/00 William Watts Folwell

References

minnesota
1891 establishments in Minnesota